Bread Head is the second album by PSD. It was released on February 9, 1999, for Lightyear Records and was produced by Baby Beesh, PSD, Jay Tee, Funk Daddy, Dave G., Jonny Z, Ephraim Galloway and Bernard Gourley.

Track listing
"So Cold" – 3:06 (featuring Young Wonder)
"Premeditated" (remix) – 3:45 
"Hustler" – 3:54 
"Tang & O.J." – 3:43 
"Ménage a Trois" – 5:08 (featuring Dion)
"Every Damn Day" – 5:19 (featuring Mac Lee)
"The Ghetto" – 4:24 (featuring Mac Lee)
"Pepi Lepew Pimpin'" – 4:10 (featuring Mac Lee)
"Bread Head" – 3:41 
"My Daily Bread" – 5:11 
"Much Luv" – 5:19 
"Ghetto" – 4:07 
"The Prize" – 4:09 
"Premeditated" – 3:15

1999 albums
PSD (rapper) albums